International speech crimes are acts of speech which are criminalized under international law. Incitement to genocide is one example, but the Nuremberg trials and the International Criminal Tribunal for the former Yugoslavia convicted some defendants of crimes against humanity based on speech acts. For example, Serb politician Vojislav Šešelj was indicted for crimes against humanity, including "war propaganda and incitement of hatred  towards  non-Serb  people". Serbian politician Radovan Karadžić was convicted of "participating in a joint criminal enterprise to commit crimes against humanity on the basis of his public speeches and broadcasts". Dario Kordić and Radoslav Brđanin were also convicted of crimes based on instigating violence in public speeches.

References

Sources

International criminal law
Speech crimes